Glenn Fraser is an Australian filmmaker with a reputation for making gritty films in a variety of arenas and forms. Most of his work focuses on the 'hidden' to some degree, either subcultures or activities which exist just beneath the surface of an ordinary life, or hidden in plain sight. Subject matter has included the highly regarded human trafficking in  The Veiled, male sexual control in Boy, female sexual empowerment in Slipper and the rise of new terrorism in the Middle East for Beautiful Voice. His filmmaking has seen him work extensively through the United Kingdom, Asia, Canada and the Middle East. 

He attended Woollahra Public School and then Sydney Boys High School, in Moore Park from 1980 to 1985.

His films have received awards and his work has been exhibited in major international film festivals including Tropfest, the Sydney Film Festival, Edinburgh International Film Festival and Sundance Film Festival.

In 2017, Fraser and the team at Transmedia Entertainment developed the world's first fully dramatised virtual reality comic book  in Moriarty: Endgame VR. The work was debuted at Wondercon 2017.

In 2018, Fraser and fellow filmmaker Karl Jenner developed the Face Off Screen Actors' Showcase. Noticing a lack of opportunities for less experienced actors to see their work on the big screen, Fraser invited actors to submit their work to go under the eye of a panel of industry experts including casting director Greg Apps, actors Kate Fitzpatrick, Tony Bonner AM, Susan Prior and producers Enzo Tedeschi and Sally Browning.

References

External links
 
 Official Site

Year of birth missing (living people)
Living people
Australian film directors
People educated at Sydney Boys High School